I Am Me. is the fifth extended play by South Korean girl group Weki Meki. It was released on November 18, 2021, by Fantagio and distributed by Kakao Entertainment. It consists of six tracks, including the title track "Siesta".

Pre-release 
The album was announced on November 8, 2021 with a "coming soon" poster. On the same day, Fantagio posted the release scheduler. Leading up to the album, a mood film for posted for each member, with lines that the members wrote themselves. Accompanying the mood films, two sets of promotional images were released for each member.

On November 12, the track list for the mini album was announced. It was also revealed that there is going to be only one version of the physical album. The album comes with a 136-page photo book.

On November 15, the first teaser for the Siesta music video was released.

Release 
The EP was released on November 18, 2021, through several music portals, including MelOn, Spotify and Apple Music. Music video for the title track was released on the same day. Fantagio organized an album showcase event that was broadcast through the streaming service VLIVE.

Commercial performance 
The EP debuted and peaked at number 12 on the Gaon Album Chart for the week ending October 20, 2021, and placed within the Top 100 for six consecutive weeks.

I Am Me. was the 53rd best-selling album in November 2021 with 11,377 copies sold. It has sold 17,366 copies as of December 2021.

Track listing

Charts

References 

2021 EPs
K-pop EPs
Hip hop EPs
Weki Meki EPs